Steven Gray (born 17 October 1981) is a retired Irish footballer who played for Drogheda United, Derry City & Bohemians in the League of Ireland as well as Dandenong Thunder, Oakleigh Cannons (2 spells) & Melbourne Heart in Australia. Gray played as a centre back.

Club career
Gray played as a youth with hometown club Leixlip United, Cherry Orchard and Verona before moving to Southampton. He returned home and was captured by Drogheda United where he was voted Drogheda United Player of the Year in 2004. During his time at United Park, Gray won a League Championship medal, an FAI Cup winners medal and two Setanta Cups.

He signed for Derry City on 26 November 2007, following the departure of Ken Oman from the club. Gray recorded his first goal for Derry City on 3 February 2009 with a game-winning goal in a 2–1 victory against Danish-side Esbjerg fB in a preseason friendly. Two weeks later, he scored his second goal with the club in a preseason friendly with Longford Town.

After his time at Derry finished, he signed for Bohemians in January 2010. In February 2010, he scored the winner against Bluebell United in the Leinster Senior Cup in his first competitive game for the Gypsies. However an achilles injury ruined Gray's campaign and he made only 4 league appearances during the 2010 season.

In June 2012, Gray went on trial with A-League club Melbourne Heart. On 2 July 2012, he signed a two-year contract with Melbourne Heart. On 6 February 2013 he was released to make way for Jamie Coyne.

Honours
Drogheda United
 League of Ireland: 2007
 FAI Cup: 2005
 Setanta Sports Cup: 2006, 2007

Bohemians
 Setanta Sports Cup: 2010

References

External links
 Player profile on Drogheda United official website

1981 births
Living people
People from Leixlip
People from County Kildare
Republic of Ireland association footballers
League of Ireland players
Southampton F.C. players
Drogheda United F.C. players
Derry City F.C. players
Bohemian F.C. players
Melbourne City FC players
Expatriate soccer players in Australia
A-League Men players
Oakleigh Cannons FC players
Cherry Orchard F.C. players
Association football central defenders